The Lawrence County Courthouse is a historic governmental building in Ironton, Ohio, United States. It was designed by Richards, McCarty & Bulford and built in 1907 after the previous courthouse burned.  Built in the Neoclassical style with a domed roof, it was expanded in 1978 by the addition of a rear annex.

Lawrence County was formed on December 20, 1816 from parts of Gallia County and Scioto County with its county seat at Burlington.

References

Government buildings completed in 1907
Buildings and structures in Lawrence County, Ohio
Courthouses in Ohio